Cosmic Love is an American reality television series. It premiered on Amazon Prime Video on August 12, 2022.

Summary
The dating show follows four single people, each representing an element of the zodiac (air, fire, water, earth), as they search for a match based solely on astrological compatibility, with couples paired based on their astrology charts. Astrologist sisters Ophira Edut and Tali Edut, aka the AstroTwins, are the show's matchmakers, who guide the singles through the Astro Chamber, a luminous orb voiced by Cree Summer.

Contestants 

 Connor Shennan
 Maria Rodriguez
 Noel Allen
 Phoebe Davis
 Adrianna Raphaela
 Ana Miranda
 Caleb McDonnell
 Christopher J. Essex
 Chris Ragusa
 Christopher Jones
 Danae DeSpain
 Darren Hopes
 David Christopher
 Jasmine Rodulfo
 Javier McIntosh
 Jazmin Potts
 Morgan Raphael
 Phillip Newhard
 Theresa Vongkhamchanh
 Yana Orlova

Episodes

Production
The series was announced on May 4, 2022. Michael Rourke is the show's creator and executive producer. Jess Castro is showrunner and executive producer of the series. Hashim Williams, Nathan Coyle, and Viki Cacciatore are also executive producing. The series was developed by Hudsun Media. There are also plans to have a version of the show filmed in France.

Release
The official trailer was released on July 27, 2022. All 10 episodes of the series premiered on Prime Video on August 12, 2022.

References

External links
 

2022 American television series debuts
2020s American reality television series
American dating and relationship reality television series
English-language television shows
Amazon Prime Video original programming
Television series by Amazon Studios
Astrology